Philornis downsi, also known as the avian vampire fly, is a species of fly (Diptera, Muscidae) that was first recorded in Trinidad and Brazil in the 1990s.  It has been accidentally introduced to the Galapagos Islands (Ecuador). Adults of P. downsi feed on fruit.  Eggs are laid in bird nests and hatch into parasitic larvae that reside in the nest material and emerge at night to feed both internally and externally on the blood and flesh of developing nestlings. The parasite causes significant mortality in Darwin's finch nestlings and threatens the survival of some rarer species such as the mangrove finch (Camarhynchus heliobates) and the medium tree finch (C. pauper). To protect the threatened finch populations, insecticide-laced cotton has been supplied as nesting material for the finches, with the results being highly successful in combating P. downsi infestations at a localized scale. Currently, Biological pest control agents, including Conura annulifera, are being investigated for their potential safety and efficacy in eradicating P. downsi on the Galapagos Islands.

References

Further reading
Dudaniec R Y, Kleindorfer S & Fessl B (2006) Effects of the introduced ectoparasite Philornis downsi on haemoglobin level and nestling survival in Darwin's small ground finch (Geospiza fuliginosa). Austral Ecology, 31, 88–94.
Fessl B, Couri M. & Tebbich S. (2001) Philornis downsi Dodge & Aitken, new to the Galápagos Islands, (Diptera, Muscidae). Studia Dipterologica, 8, 317–322.
Fessl B, Kleindorfer S & Tebbich S. (2006a) An experimental study on the effects of an introduced parasite in Darwin's finches. Biological Conservation, 127, 55–61.
Fessl B, Sinclair BJ & Kleindorfer S (2006b) The life cycle of Philornis downsi (Diptera: Muscidae) parasitizing Darwin's finches and its impacts on nestling survival. Parasitology, 133, 739–747.
Huber S K (2008) Effects of the introduced parasite Philornis downsi on nestling growth and mortality in the medium ground finch (Geospiza fortis). Biological Conservation, 141, 601–609.
Huber SK, Owen JP, Koop, JAH, King MO, Grant PR, Grant BR, Clayton DH (2010) Ecoimmunity in Darwin's Finches: Invasive Parasites Trigger Acquired Immunity in the Medium Ground Finch (Geospiza fortis). PLoS One. 5(1):e8605
 O'Connor JA, Robertson, J, & Kleindorfer, S (2010) Video analysis of host-parasite interactions in Darwin's finch nests. Oryx, 44, 588–594.

External links 
Global Invasive Species Database: Philornis downsi

 GlSD Philornis downsi profile

Muscidae
Parasites of birds
Parasitic flies
Ectoparasites